Chiluvur railway station (station code:CLVR), is an Indian railway station in Chiluvur of Andhra Pradesh. It lies on the Vijayawada–Gudur section of Howrah–Chennai main line and is administered under Vijayawada railway division of South Central Railway zone.

Classification 
In terms of earnings and outward passengers handled, Chiluvur is categorized as a Halt Grade-2 (HG-2) railway station. Based on the re–categorization of Indian Railway stations for the period of 2017–18 and 2022–23, an HG–2 category station earns between  lakh and handles  passengers.

See also 
 List of railway stations in India

References 

Railway stations in Guntur district
Railway stations in Vijayawada railway division